Badgingarra Wind Farm is a wind farm in the locality of Hill River northwest of the town of Badgingarra in Western Australia, about  north of Perth. It is owned by APA Group and located immediately north of the older Emu Downs Wind Farm which has the same owner.

Construction of Badgingarra Wind Farm began in November 2017 and it was completed in early 2019. It consists of 37 Siemens wind turbine generators, each generating 3.6 MW of electricity. APA Group is also constructing the Badgingarra Solar Farm adjacent to the wind farm to provide 17.5 MW of solar photovoltaic generation.

Badgingarra Wind Farm was officially opened by the Western Australian Energy Minister, Bill Johnston on 2 May 2019. It is connected to the Western Power network North Country region. The output is contracted to Alinta Energy until the end of 2035. The wind farm is expected to generate 500–550 GWh of energy per annum.

Operations 
AEMO records begin in January 2019 for the wind farm. The generation table uses AEMO Facility SCADA to obtain generation values for each month.  

Note: Asterisk indicates power output was limited during the month.

References 

Wheatbelt (Western Australia)
Wind farms in Western Australia